Derek Ivor Colin Kapp (3 April 1928 – 3 August 2007), Known as Colin Kapp, was a British science fiction author best known for his stories about the Unorthodox Engineers.

As an electronic engineer, he began his career with Mullard Electronics then specialised in electroplating techniques, eventually becoming a freelance consultant engineer.

He was born in Southwark, south London, 3 April 1928 to John L. F. Kapp and Annie M.A. (née Towner).

Works

Cageworld series

 Search for the sun! (1982) (also published as Cageworld)
 The Lost worlds of Cronus (1982)
 The Tyrant of Hades (1984)
 Star Search (1984)

Chaos series
 The Patterns of Chaos (1972)
 The Chaos Weapon (1977)

Standalone novels
 The Dark Mind (1964) (also published as Transfinite Man)
 The Wizard of Anharitte (1973)
 The Survival Game (1976)
 Manalone (1977)
 The Ion War (1978)
 The Timewinders (1980)

Short stories

Unorthodox Engineers 
"The Railways Up on Cannis" (1959)
"The Subways of Tazoo" (1964)
"The Pen and the Dark" (1966)
"Getaway from Getawehi" (1969)
"The Black Hole of Negrav" (1975)
Collected in The Unorthodox Engineers (1979)

Other stories
"Breaking Point" (1959)
"Survival Problem" (1959)
"Lambda I" (1962)
"The Night-Flame" (1964)
"Hunger Over Sweet Waters" (1965)
"Ambassador to Verdammt" (1967)
"The Imagination Trap" (1967)
"The Cloudbuilders" (1968)
"I Bring You Hands" (1968)
"Gottlos" (1969), notable for having (along with Keith Laumer's Bolo series) inspired Steve Jackson's classic game of 21st century tank warfare Ogre.
"The Teacher" (1969)
"Letter from an Unknown Genius" (1971)
"What the Thunder Said" (1972)
"Which Way Do I Go For Jericho?" (1972)
"The Old King's Answers" (1973)
"Crimescan" (1973)
"What The Thunder Said" (1973)
"Mephisto and the Ion Explorer" (1974)
"War of the Wastelife" (1974)
"Cassius and the Mind-Jaunt" (1975)
"Something in the City" (1984)
"An Alternative to Salt" (1986)

References

External links

Bibliography kept by Jarl Totland

Bibliography at SciFan

1929 births
2007 deaths
British science fiction writers
British short story writers
British male novelists
British male short story writers
20th-century British novelists
20th-century British short story writers
20th-century British male writers